Lyria sabaensis is a species of sea snail, a marine gastropod mollusk in the family Volutidae, the volutes.

Description

Distribution

References

 Bail, P., 1993. Le genre Lyria Gray, 1847 (Part II). Xenophora 64: 4-19

External links
 MNHN, Paris: holotype of Lyria beauii sabaensis 

Volutidae
Gastropods described in 1993